Blanford's jerboa (Jaculus blanfordi) is a species of rodent in the family Dipodidae. It is native to Central Asia and is found in Turkmenistan, Uzbekistan, Afghanistan, Iran and Pakistan.

Taxonomy
Blanford's jerboa was first described in 1884 by the British zoologist James Albert Murray, curator of the Karachi Museum and author of a number of books on the birds and mammals of the Indian subcontinent. He named it "Jaculus blanfordi" in honour of the British geologist and zoologist William Thomas Blanford who was a member of the Indian Geological Survey and later published works on the fauna of India.

Distribution and habitat
Blanford's jerboa is native to Central Asia. Its range extends from Turkmenistan and Iran, through the Kyzyl Kum Desert and Karakum Desert to central Uzbekistan, Afghanistan and southwestern Pakistan. Its typical habitat is bare clayey or gravelly areas in deserts and other arid localities, but not sandy areas with dunes.

Behaviour
Blanford's jerboa is a solitary rodent and digs long tunnels in hard ground in which to live. It uses its incisors to loosen the soil, its fore-limbs for digging and pushing loose material under its body, its hind limbs to kick the soil backwards and its snout to ram loose soil. This jerboa feeds on seeds and such desert plants as Artemisia aucheri, Anabasis aphylla and Peganum harmala, and pieces of stem and leaf have been found inside burrows.

Status
Blanford's jerboa has a wide range and is presumed to have a large total population. In some areas, such as Turkmenistan and Uzbekistan, the species is thought to be in decline as some of its habitat is brought under cultivation. However, any decline in total population is small and the International Union for Conservation of Nature has assessed its conservation status as being of "least concern".

References

Blanford's jerboa
Mammals of Central Asia
Mammals of Afghanistan
Mammals of Pakistan
Fauna of Iran
Blanford's jerboa
Taxa named by James A. Murray (zoologist)
Taxonomy articles created by Polbot